Featherweight is a weight class in the combat sports of boxing, kickboxing, mixed martial arts, and Greco-Roman wrestling.

Including:
Featherweight (MMA) in mixed martial arts refers to different weight classes
Super featherweight junior lightweight (IBF and WBO)
Super bantamweight, also known as junior featherweight or light featherweight

Products
Singer Featherweight sewing machines produced from 1933 to 1968

Music
"Featherweight", track from Prime Time (Count Basie album)
"Featherweight", track from Lucy (Candlebox album)
"Featherweight", song by Fleet Foxes from Shore (album)